John Greeley Jenkins (8 September 1851 – 22 February 1923) was an American-Australian politician. He was Premier of South Australia from 1901 to 1905. He had previously served as Minister for Education and the Northern Territory and Commissioner for Public Works under Thomas Playford II, Commissioner of Public Works under Charles Kingston and Chief Secretary under Frederick Holder. He was subsequently Agent-General for South Australia from 1905 to 1908.

Background and early career
Jenkins was born in Pennsylvania, the fourth son of Evan Jenkins and Mary Davis of South Wales. He was educated at the Wyoming Seminary, Pennsylvania, and after working on his father's farm, became in 1872 a traveller for a publishing company. He came to South Australia in 1878 as a representative of this company, but presently began importing both American and English books. He was for a time manager in South Australia for the Picturesque Atlas of Australasia, and afterwards was partner with C. G. Gurr in an estate agency and auctioneering business at Adelaide.

Political career
In June 1886 he was elected a member of the South Australian House of Assembly for East Adelaide and in 1887 transferred to Sturt. In March 1891 he became minister of education in the second Playford ministry, and exchanged this for the portfolio of commissioner of public works in January 1892. The ministry resigned in June 1892 and on 20 April 1894 Jenkins was again given this position in the Kingston ministry which remained in office until 1 December 1899. A week later the second liberal Holder ministry was formed with Jenkins as chief secretary, and when Holder went into federal politics in May 1901, Jenkins became premier, chief secretary, and minister controlling the Northern Territory, forming government with the support of none other than the Australasian National League (formerly National Defence League). He was ridiculed from inside and outside of the party, with one critic describing Jenkins as a "political acrobat". As premier he took an important share of the work connected with ministerial bills, and among the acts he was responsible for were those providing free education, the Happy Valley water-supply system for Adelaide, and the transcontinental railway. He also played a major role in an agreement between the States about the River Murray, and in continuing attempts to develop the Northern Territory. As chief secretary in Holder's government, he was also minister for defence and had responsibility for the four South Australian contingents to the South African War. Taking over from Holder, Jenkins was premier from 1901 to 1905 and through the 1902 election, and was succeeded as liberal leader by Archibald Peake, who would allow Labor to form government at the 1905 election. Peake would form the Liberal and Democratic Union for the 1906 election.

Post-political career
On 1 March 1905 he resigned to become agent-general for South Australia at London. He gave up the position in 1908 on account of a disagreement with the Price government on the question of a loan. He remained in London and was active in connection with international trade congresses but retained his interest in Australia. He was once described as "Australia's Unofficial High Commissioner". In 1918 he stood for Putney in an election for the British House of Commons, on behalf of the short-lived right-wing National Party, but was defeated. He had a good standing in the city of London, and when the chamber of commerce sent a delegation to the United States of America, Jenkins was the chief spokesman. He also revisited Australia with a project for the development of Papua. He died in London, following an operation. He married Jeannie Mary, daughter of W. H. Charlton of Adelaide, who survived him with a son and a daughter.

He published pamphlets on Australian Products, and Social Conditions of Australia, and also edited the Australasian section of the Encyclopaedia Americana.

He was an active member of the South Australian Literary Societies' Union and in 1884 the first Premier of the associated Union Parliament.

See also
Hundred of Jenkins

References

External links

|-

|-

|-

|-

1851 births
1923 deaths
Premiers of South Australia
Members of the South Australian House of Assembly
American emigrants to Australia
Australian expatriates in the United Kingdom
Australian auctioneers